The  ( AÖFV, English: General Austrian Women's Association) was an Austrian women's organization for women's suffrage, active between 1893 and 1919.

It was the main women's suffrage organisation in Austria.

History

Background
However, in the aftermath of the violent suppression of the revolution, the political participation of women was forbidden and the club dissolved.

However, even this fragmentary and incomplete right to vote was retracted between 1884 and 1904 in the wake of electoral reforms, which prompted renewed efforts by women to gain proper voting rights. In 1892, the Social Democratic Party of Austria included the demand for a general, equal and secret suffrage without distinctions based on gender in its party platform. Yet male party members often provided little support, and women's suffrage was generally deemed a goal of only minor importance.

Foundation
Auguste Fickert was elected its first president, other important members were Rosa Mayreder as vice-president, Marie Lang and Marianne Hainisch. Irma von Troll-Borostyani was also a co-founder.

Early Years
Although associations were forbidden by law from being politically active, individual persons were not, which allowed Auguste Frickert to call public gatherings on political topics. Through statements on contemporary issues such as maternity leave, prostitution, sexuality and women's suffrage, the AÖFV contributed to the politization of women. From the middle of the 1890s, the club campaigned for a reform of marital and family law, and championed the issues of middle-class working women and female civil servants. In 1894, Therese Schlesinger joined and became an important participant.

Between 1893 and 1897 the monthly party paper  (The right of the woman) was published with the help of liberal politician Ferdinand Kronawetter and his  (The people's voice). After a fallout between Fickert and Mayreder and their associate Marie Lang, publication was ceased, and the new magazine became Neues Frauenleben (New lives of women) which was circulated between 1902 and 1918.

Cooperation and Conflict
In 1902, several Austrian women's associations joined to form the (still extant) umbrella organization  (Federation of Austrian women's associations), and the  became a member.

Already in 1895, on initiative from Fickert a consulting service called  had been established in Vienna, which gave (especially poor and unmarried) women pro bono legal advice. Originally this counseling was done in Fickert's private home, but later the city of Vienna allowed the use of an office in a public building; by 1901 the service operated from three separate places, and a year later it had grown so much that it was organized as its own section of the AÖFV.

These included primarily postwomen and later female operators of telegraphs.

This has been interpreted as a split between a moderate (BÖFV) and radical (AÖFV) wing of Austria's women's movement.

Final Years
Auguste Fickert died in 1910, and the presidency was left vacant at first, with Mathilde Hanzel-Hübner sharing the vice-presidency with Sofie Regen. Although Jewish women had previously held important positions within the association, in the wake of the First World War, antisemitic discussions ensued related to Leopoldine Kulka (who was opposed to antisemitism) and her wish to succeed Fickert. The war at first halted most suffragette efforts, and it was not until 1916 that women returned to campaigning, and it took another year until women's associations held meetings again. The issue of pacifism was controversial, as pacifist activities were forbidden; but the AÖFV - unlike other women's associations - adhered to its anti-war principles.

On 12 November 1918, after the collapse of Austria-Hungary, the Republic of German-Austria was proclaimed, which granted active and passive suffrage to all adult citizens regardless of gender. This meant that women's suffrage had finally been achieved in Austria. Still, several members continued their political activities on an international level, for example within the Women's International League for Peace and Freedom.

Goals
The association's primary aim was to enable women to participate in the improvement of the society, which included general welfare, the school system, and demilitarization. The right for women to vote was seen as a means to reach these goals.

Notes

References

1919 disestablishments in Austria
Political organisations based in Austria
Women's suffrage in Austria
Organizations established in 1893
Organizations disestablished in 1919
Feminist organizations in Austria
Establishments in the Empire of Austria (1867–1918)
Women's organisations based in Austria